Daniel MacAleese (1833 – 1 December 1900) was an Irish nationalist politician and Member of Parliament (MP) in the House of Commons of the United Kingdom of Great Britain and Ireland.

He was elected as the Irish National Federation (Anti-Parnellite) MP for the North Monaghan constituency at the 1895 general election, and was re-elected unopposed as the Irish Parliamentary Party MP at the 1900 general election. He died in office in 1900 and the subsequent by-election was won by Edward Charles Thompson.

External links

1833 births
1900 deaths
Anti-Parnellite MPs
Irish Parliamentary Party MPs
Members of the Parliament of the United Kingdom for County Monaghan constituencies (1801–1922)
UK MPs 1895–1900
UK MPs 1900–1906
Politicians from County Monaghan